Semecarpus riparius is a species of plant in the family Anacardiaceae. It is endemic to New Caledonia. The specific epithet is also spelt riparia.

References

Endemic flora of New Caledonia
riparius
Endangered plants
Taxonomy articles created by Polbot